Sri Lanka is a semi-presidential representative democratic republic, whereby the President of Sri Lanka is both head of state and head of government, and it relies on a multi-party system. Executive power is exercised by the President on the advice of the Prime Minister and the Cabinet of Ministers. Legislative power is vested in the Parliament. For decades, the party system was dominated by the socialist Sri Lanka Freedom Party and the conservative United National Party. The Judiciary is independent of the executive and the legislature.

Executive branch

|President
|Ranil Wickremesinghe
|United National Party
|21 July 2022
|-
|Prime Minister
|Dinesh Gunawardena
|Mahajana Eksath Peramuna
|22 July 2022
|}
The president, directly elected for a five-year term, is head of state, head of government, and commander in chief of the armed forces. The election occurs under the Sri Lankan form of the contingent vote. Responsible to Parliament for the exercise of duties under the constitution and laws, the president may be removed from office by a two-thirds vote of Parliament with the concurrence of the Supreme Court.

The president appoints and heads a cabinet of ministers responsible to Parliament. The president's deputy is the prime minister, who leads the ruling party in Parliament. A parliamentary no-confidence vote requires dissolution of the cabinet and the appointment of a new one by the President.

Legislative branch
The Parliament has 225 members, elected for a five-year term, 196 members elected in multi-seat constituencies and 29 by proportional representation.

The primary modification is that the party that receives the largest number of valid votes in each constituency gains a unique "bonus seat" (see Hickman, 1999). The president may summon, suspend, or end a legislative session and can dissolve Parliament at any time after one year from the General Elections (except in a few limited circumstances). The President can also dissolve Parliament before the completion of one year, if requested to do so by resolution signed by at least half the MPs. Parliament reserves the power to make all laws. Since its independence in 1948, Sri Lanka has remained a member of the Commonwealth of Nations.

Political parties and elections

In August 2005, the Supreme Court ruled that presidential elections would be held in November 2005, resolving a long-running dispute on the length of President Kumaratunga's term. Prime Minister Mahinda Rajapaksa was nominated the SLFP candidate and former Prime Minister Ranil Wickremesinghe as the UNP candidate. The election was held on 17 November 2005, and Mahinda Rajapaksa was elected the 5th Executive President of Sri Lanka winning 50.3% of valid votes, compared to Ranil Wickremesinghe's 48.4%. Mahinda Rajapaksa took oath as president on 19 November 2005. Ratnasiri Wickremanayake was appointed the 22nd Prime Minister on 21 November 2005, to fill the post vacated by Mahinda Rajapaksa. He was previously Prime Minister from 2000 until 2001.

President Mahinda Rajapaksa lost the 2015 presidential elections, ending his ten-year presidency. However, his successor, President Maithripala Sirisena, decided not to seek re-election in 2019. This enabled the Rajapaksa family to regain power in the 2019 presidential elections. Mahinda Rajapaksa's younger brother and former wartime defence chief Gotabaya Rajapaksa won the election, and was sworn in as the 7th Executive President of Sri Lanka. The Rajapaksa's firm grip of power consolidated in the parliamentary elections held in August 2020. The family's political party Sri Lanka People's Front (known by its Sinhala initials SLPP) won a landslide victory and a clear majority in the parliament, and five members of the Rajapaksa family won a seat in the parliament. Former President Mahinda Rajapaksa became the new prime minister.

2019 presidential election

2020 parliamentary election

Administrative divisions
Local government is divided into two parallel structures, the civil service, which dates to colonial times, and the provincial councils, which were established in 1987.

Civil Service Structure
The country is divided into 25 districts, each of which has a district secretary (the GA, or Government Agent) who is appointed. Each district comprises 5–16 divisions, each with a DS, or divisional secretary, again, appointed. At a village level Grama Niladari (Village Officers), Samurdhi Niladari (Development Officers) and agriculture extension officers work for the DSs.

Provincial Council structure
Under the Indo-Sri Lankan Accord of July 1987—and the resulting 13th amendment to the constitution—the Government of Sri Lanka agreed to devolve some authority to the provinces. Provincial councils are directly elected for 5-year terms. The leader of the council majority serves as the province's Chief Minister with a board of ministers; a provincial governor is appointed by the president.

The Provincial Councils have full statute making power with respect to the Provincial Council List, and shared statute making power respect to the Concurrent List. While all matters set out in the Reserved List are under the central government.

Local government structure

Below the provincial level are elected Municipal Councils and Urban Councils, responsible for municipalities and cities respectively, and below this level Pradeshiya Sabhas (village councils), again elected. There are 24 Municipal Councils, 41 Urban Councils and 276 Pradeshiya Sabhas.

Judicial branch
Sri Lanka's judiciary consists of a Supreme Court, Court of Appeal, High Court, and a number of subordinate courts. Sri Lanka's legal system reflects diverse cultural influences. Criminal law is fundamentally British. Basic civil law is Roman-Dutch, but laws pertaining to marriage, divorce, and inheritance are communal, known as respectively as Kandyan,
Thesavalamai (Jaffna Tamil) and Muslim (Roman-Dutch law applies to Low-country Sinhalese, Estate Tamils and others).

Courts of law
Supreme Court of Sri Lanka 
Court of Appeal of Sri Lanka
High Court of Sri Lanka
District Courts 
Magistrate's Courts
Primary Courts

Foreign relations of Sri Lanka

Sri Lanka generally follows a non-aligned foreign policy but has been seeking closer relations with the United States since December 1977. It participates in multilateral diplomacy, particularly at the United Nations, where it seeks to promote sovereignty, independence, and development in the developing world. Sri Lanka was a founding member of the Non-Aligned Movement (NAM). It also is a member of the Commonwealth, the South Asian Association for Regional Cooperation (SAARC), the World Bank, International Monetary Fund, Asian Development Bank, and the Colombo Plan. Sri Lanka continues its active participation in the NAM, while also stressing the importance it places on regionalism by playing a strong role in SAARC.

Sri Lanka is member of the IAEA, IBRD, ADB, C, CP, ESCAP, FAO, G-24, G-77, ICAO, ICRM, IDA, IFAD, IFC, IFRCS, IHO, ILO, IMF, IMO, Inmarsat, Intelsat, Interpol, IOC, IOM, ISO, ITU, NAM, OAS (observer), OPCW, PCA, SAARC, UN, UNCTAD, UNESCO, UNIDO, UNU, UPU, WCL, WCO, WFTU, WHO, WIPO, WMO, WToO, WTrO.
І

The growing interest of other countries in making their claims to Sri Lanka's strategic assets has been generating heated discussion among national and international circles. Worth noting, China, India and Japan's involvement in Sri Lankan seaport developments is a direct consequence of the ongoing tussle among these three nations to get a firm foothold in this very strategically located island state of Sri Lanka.

Political pressure groups
Civil society participation in decision-making and opinion-shaping is very poor in Sri Lanka. Professionals, civil society groups, media etc. do not play a significant role in Sri Lankan politics and, as a result, many aspects of the lives of ordinary citizens are politicized. In addition, the vacuum created by the silence and inactivity of civil society has let in radical groups such as the ethnic/religion-based groups, Sri Lanka trade unions; and NGOs have taken lead roles as political pressure groups.

See also
 List of rulers of Ceylon
 List of presidents of Sri Lanka
 List of prime ministers of Sri Lanka
 Sri Lanka leftist parties

Notes

References

Sources

Hickman, J. 1999.  "Explaining the Two-Party System in Sri Lanka's National Assembly."  Contemporary South Asia, Volume 8, Number 1 (March), pp. 29–40  (A detailed description of the effects of the bonus seat provision).
James Jupp, Sri Lanka: Third World Democracy, London: Frank Cass and Company, Limited, 1978.

Further reading
Robert C. Oberst. "Federalism and Ethnic Conflict in Sri Lanka", Publius, Vol. 18, No. 3, The State of American Federalism, 1987 (Summer, 1988), pp. 175–193

External links

 Office of the Governor –  Uva / ඌව පලාත් ආණ්ඩුකාරවර කාර්යාලය